Anepsiomyia flaviventris is a species of fly in the family Dolichopodidae. It is found in Northwestern and central Europe, as well as in Portugal.

References

Peloropeodinae
Insects described in 1824
Asilomorph flies of Europe
Palearctic insects
Taxa named by Johann Wilhelm Meigen